North River is a community in the Canadian province of Nova Scotia, located in Colchester County near Truro, Nova Scotia. It was settled in the 1760s as part of what was then Onslow Township, one of the many townships set up by the British Government in Halifax to encourage planters to come to Nova Scotia to work the land. Onslow Township was settled by New England Planters from the area around Boston, Massachusetts and from New Hampshire.  The original occupation of the new immigrants was farming.

References

North River on Destination Nova Scotia

Communities in Colchester County